Nicolas Mahut and Édouard Roger-Vasselin were the defending champions, but lost to Pierre-Hugues Herbert and Nicolas Renavand 6–3, 4–6, [5–10] in the final.

Seeds

Draw

Draw

References
 Doubles Draw

Challenger DCNS de Cherbourg - Doubles
2011 Doubles